Kevin Vázquez Comesaña (born 23 March 1993), simply known as Kevin, is a Spanish professional footballer who plays for Celta de Vigo as a right-back.

Career
Born in Nigrán, Pontevedra, Galicia, Kevin joined Celta de Vigo's youth setup in 2009. On 14 February of the following year, he made his senior debut with the reserves at the age of just 16, coming on as a late substitute for Álex López in a 3–2 Segunda División B away loss against SD Eibar.

Kevin was definitely promoted to the B-team ahead of the 2012–13 campaign now in Tercera División, and contributed with 14 appearances as his side achieved immediate promotion back to the third division. On 28 June 2016, now already an undisputed starter, he renewed his contract until 2018.

Kevin scored his first senior goal on 5 February 2017, netting the second in a 4–0 away routing of Pontevedra CF. In July of the following year, he was definitely promoted to the main squad in La Liga, and extended his contract until 2023.

Kevin made his professional debut on 2 October 2018, starting in a 1–1 home draw against Real Sociedad, for the season's Copa del Rey.

Career statistics

Club

References

External links

1993 births
Living people
Spanish footballers
Footballers from Nigrán
Association football fullbacks
La Liga players
Segunda División B players
Tercera División players
Celta de Vigo B players
RC Celta de Vigo players